Copanatoyac  is a city and seat of the municipality of Copanatoyac, in the state of Guerrero, in southwestern Mexico.

References 

Populated places in Guerrero